Ocyptamus parvicornis, the scarlet hover fly, is a species in the family Syrphidae.

It was proposed in 2020 that this species be moved to a new genus, Victoriana, and it is now sometimes referred to as Victoriana parvicornis.

References

Syrphini
Articles created by Qbugbot
Taxa named by Hermann Loew
Insects described in 1861